Ludwig Hermann Karl Hahn (23 January 1908 – 10 November 1986) was a German SS-Standartenführer, Nazi official and convicted war criminal. He held numerous positions with the police and security services over the course of his career with the Schutzstaffel (SS).

As a senior officer of the Sicherheitspolizei (Security Police) and Sicherheitsdienst (Security Service) in occupied-Poland, Hahn was directly involved in the destruction and liquidation of the Warsaw Ghetto (1942) and the brutal suppression of both the Warsaw Ghetto Uprising (1943) and the Warsaw Uprising (1944).

Biography
The son of a prosperous farmer of the same name, Hahn was born on January 23, 1908, in the rural town of Eitzen, Uelzen district, Province of Hanover in what was then the German Empire. Hahn attended Volksschule as a youth and was then enrolled at the Lüneburg Realgymnasium, graduating in 1927.

Hahn went on to study financial law at the University of Göttingen where he became a member of the National Socialist German Students' League. In February 1930 he joined both the Nazi Party (NSDAP Nr. 194 463) and the Sturmabteilung (SA), where he would rise to the rank of Scharführer (corporal). After successfully defending his dissertation before the Faculty of Law at the University of Jena, Hahn obtained his doctorate of jurisprudence (Dr. jur.) in July 1932. He joined the Schutzstaffel (SS) in April 1933 (SS Nr. 65 823) and was assigned to the 17th SS-Standarte (regiment) in Lüneburg and later transferred to the 26th SS-Standarte in Hamburg.

Early Nazi career
After attending the Nazi Party's State School for Leadership and Politics, Hahn joined the Sicherheitsdienst (SD) in May 1934 and was attached to the SS Regional Headquarters in Weimar as a member of the Stabswache. Hahn qualified as a lawyer after completing his legal clerkship in April 1935 and became a member of the National Socialist Association of Legal Professionals (NS-Rechtswahrerbund). That same year he married Charlotte Steinhoff, sister of the Luftwaffe fighter pilot Johannes Steinhoff, who later served as a senior General with the postwar West German Air Force and was also Chairman of the NATO Military Committee from 1971 to 1974. The couple would have four children.

Hahn began his career with the Nazi security services in June 1935 when he was employed as a consultant (Referent) by the SD-Hauptamt in Berlin. The following year he served as Deputy Director of the Gestapo bureau in Hanover, before returning to Berlin in November 1936 to work as a legal counselor (Regierungsassessor) at Gestapo Headquarters. Hahn underwent military-training with the Wehrmacht in Brandenburg an der Havel and was subsequently reassigned to Weimar as Director of the city's Gestapo branch (Kriminalrat) and Deputy Chief of the Security Police (Stellvertreter Polizeiprasident). He would hold this position from April 1937 to August 1939.

Hahn was promoted to the rank of SS-Sturmbannführer (major) in September, 1938. During the build-up to World War II he was transferred to Vienna, Austria in preparation for the looming invasion of Poland. He was assigned to Einsatzgruppe I under the command of Brigadeführer Bruno Streckenbach, and was given command of the sub-unit of Einsatzkommando 1/I. During the invasion of Poland in September 1939, Hahn and his unit were attached to the German 14th Army in the territories of Silesia and Malopolska.

World War II
Hahn and his Einsatzkommando took part in the arrests and executions carried out as part of Intelligenzaktion, the Nazi extermination campaign targeting the Polish intelligentsia. Between September and November 1939 Hahn and Einsatzgruppe I were involved in the mass-killing of Polish public officials, activists, intellectuals and army officers in the cities of Katowice, Sanok and Podlesie. They also played a leading role in the expulsion of the Jewish population from the town of Dynow and managed their subsequent deportation into Soviet-occupied eastern Poland.

Beginning in January 1940 Hahn took over as Commander of the Sicherheitspolizei (SiPo) and Sicherheitsdienst (SD) in the occupied city of Kraków. Here he would oversee Sonderaktion Krakau, an SS operation which involved the deportation of hundreds of professors and other academics from Jagiellonian University to various concentration camps in Germany. He also served as chief of the "Police Emergency Court" (Standgericht) at Montelupich Prison. In this capacity Hahn was instrumental in the implementation of the German AB-Aktion in Poland.

In August 1940 Hahn was transferred to Bratislava, Slovakia where had been appointed Special Representative (Sonderbeauftragter) of the Reichsführer-SS. In this position Hahn served as SS leader Heinrich Himmler's personal emissary to the Nazi-allied government of the Slovak Republic under Jozef Tiso. From April to June 1941 Hahn was stationed in Athens, Greece where he commanded Einsatzgruppe Griechenland during the Balkan Campaign. Following the German victory in the offensive, he was promoted to the rank of SS-Obersturmbannführer (lieutenant colonel) and returned to his diplomatic post in Slovakia.

Warsaw

In August 1941, Hahn returned to Poland and was appointed Commander of the SiPo and SD for the city of Warsaw. During his tenure Hahn was directly involved in the implementation of the Holocaust in Poland. While serving under SS and Police Leader Ferdinand von Sammern-Frankenegg in the summer of 1942, Hahn collaborated with Brigadeführer Odilo Globocnik and other personnel associated with Operation Reinhard to carry out the destruction and liquidation of the Warsaw Ghetto. Nearly 265,000 Jews perished in the operation, either in mass-shootings conducted by the SS or after being deported to the extermination camp at Treblinka.

As a deputy officer to SS and Police Leader Jürgen Stroop, Hahn also had a leading role in the bloody suppression of the Warsaw Ghetto Uprising in April and May 1943. The brutal pacification of the ghetto by the SS resulted in the deaths of 13,000 Jews either killed in the fighting or executed. Hahn later orchestrated the deportation of another 56,000 Jews from Warsaw to Treblinka in the aftermath of the rebellion. In April 1944, Hahn was promoted to the rank of SS-Standartenführer (colonel) and received the further title of Oberst der Polizei.

During the August–October 1944 Warsaw Uprising by the Polish Home Army Hahn fought with the Waffen-SS, leading a battalion of 700 men in the southern districts of the city and later in the downtown area. He also personally commanded the defense of Warsaw’s heavily fortified government district. Following the capitulation of the uprising, Hahn, acting on instructions from Himmler, ordered the mass-killing of Polish civilians in retaliation for the rebellion. Between August and September of 1944 an estimated 5 to 10 thousand men women and children were shot by the Gestapo, mainly in the ruins of the former General Inspectorate of the Armed Forces. Hahn was awarded the Iron Cross, 1st Class for his service in the Uprising.

Later service with the SS
In November 1944, Hahn departed Warsaw and returned to Germany. He was stationed in the town of Cochem and was appointed commander of Einsatzgruppe L which was attached to the German Sixth Panzer Army during the Battle of the Bulge. After the failure of the Ardennes offensive, Hahn was transferred to Army Group Vistula on the Eastern Front to serve as a delegate for the SiPo and SD on the general staff of SS-Obergruppenführer Carl Oberg during the Vistula-Oder offensive. In February 1945, he was reassigned to Dresden, where he briefly served as Stabsführer (chief of staff) to SS-Gruppenführer Ludolf von Alvensleben, the Higher SS and Police Leader for the Elbe.

Hahn was next appointed Commander of the SiPo and SD for the city of Wiesbaden in March, 1945. However, he was quickly displaced from this position after the city fell to the Allies and instead took over as Commander of the SiPo and SD for Gau Westphalia-North. Hahn was also charged with overseeing the security detail for Gauleiter Alfred Meyer. During the final weeks of the war Hahn and his staff fled to Hessisch-Oldendorf to escape the Allied advance. He was taken prisoner by the British Army on April 12, 1945 but successfully escaped from custody shortly afterward.

Postwar life
Hahn remained in Germany after 1945 and went into hiding in Bad Eilsen in the British occupation zone, working for several years as a laborer and farmhand. He later moved to Wuppertal where he worked as a salesman with the textile company of Scharpenack & Teschenmacher. He resumed using his real name in 1949. At a denazification hearing in 1950, Hahn's wife Charlotte falsely claimed to British authorities that her husband had been taken prisoner by the Russians and deported, prompting the British Army to end its war crimes investigation of him.

Afterward, Hahn would go on to pursue a successful postwar career as an insurance broker in West Germany. In 1951 his father-in-law arranged for him to take a position as Deputy Director for Organizational Matters with the Hanover branch of Karlsruher Lebensversicherung A.G. He rose to the office of branch manager in 1955. Hahn and his family relocated to Hamburg in 1958 where he had been hired as head of the life insurance division of Hans Rudolf Schmidt & Co. GmbH. The family settled in a comfortable home in the suburb of Bonningstedt.

Trials and convictions

Hahn's identity was uncovered by journalists in 1960. Following an inquiry by the Central Office of the State Justice Administrations for the Investigation of National Socialist Crimes, Hahn was arrested by the West German federal police for his suspected involvement in the destruction of the Warsaw Ghetto. He was held by West German investigators for a year, however no charges were brought and he was released in 1961. Following his release Hahn took a position with the Hamburg branch of Investors Overseas Service. He retired in 1967.

He was again arrested by West German police in 1965 and again in 1966 but was only briefly held each time and never charged with any crime. It was not until May 1972 that Hahn was successfully charged with war crimes by the Higher Regional Court of Hamburg. The now 65-year-old Hahn was found guilty in connection with wartime atrocities committed at the Pawiak prison in Warsaw. Hahn was sentenced to 12 years in prison in June 1973 but petitioned the court for an appeal of the verdict. After a two-year review of the trial and the evidence, Hahn's appeal was rejected by the West German judiciary and he entered prison in March 1975.

During the appeals process, Hahn was also on trial in a different West German court; this case surrounded his alleged role in the deportation of an estimated 230,000 Jews from the Warsaw Ghetto to Treblinka. The proceedings opened in October 1974 and Hahn was again found guilty at trial. On 4 July 1975 Hahn was given a further sentence of life imprisonment. Suffering from cancer, Hahn was granted early release from prison in September 1983. He died in Ammersbek on 10 November 1986.

Summary of SS career
Dates of rank
 SS-Standartenführer, Regierungs- und Kriminaldirektor, Oberst der Polizei  (April 20, 1944)
 SS-Obersturmbannführer  (November 9, 1941)
 Oberregierungs- und Kriminalrat  (September 12, 1941)
 SS-Sturmbannführer, Regierungs und Kriminalrat  (September 26, 1938)
 SS-Hauptsturmführer und Kriminalrat  (August 1, 1938)
 SS-Obersturmführer und Kriminalkommissar  (January 30, 1938)
 SS-Untersturmführer  (April 20, 1936)
 SS-Hauptscharführer  (November 9, 1935)
 SS-Unterscharführer  (June 1, 1935)
 SS-Rottenführer  (November 9, 1934)
 SA-Scharführer  (December 1930)

Awards and decorations
 Iron Cross, First Class  (October 9, 1944)
 War Merit Cross with Swords  (January 30, 1943)
 Iron Cross, Second Class  (July 6, 1940)
 Ehrendegen der Reichsfuhrer-SS Totenkopfring der SS''
Honor Chevron for the Old Guard

References

External links

1908 births
1986 deaths
Gestapo personnel
Einsatzgruppen personnel
Sturmabteilung personnel
SS-Standartenführer
Holocaust perpetrators in Poland
Warsaw Ghetto
Reich Security Main Office personnel
People from Uelzen (district)
People convicted of murder by Germany
Prisoners sentenced to life imprisonment by Germany